Steven Robert Guttenberg (born August 24, 1958) is an American actor, author, businessman, producer, and director. He is known for his lead roles in Hollywood films of the 1980s and 1990s, including Cocoon, Police Academy, Three Men and a Baby, Diner, The Bedroom Window, Three Men and a Little Lady, The Big Green, and Short Circuit.

Early life
Guttenberg was born on August 24, 1958, in Brooklyn, New York, the only son, along with his two sisters, of Ann Iris (née Newman), a surgical assistant, and Jerome Stanley Guttenberg, an electrical engineer. His godfather is actor Michael Bell. He had a Jewish upbringing in the Flushing neighborhood of the borough of Queens. In 1976, he graduated from Plainedge High School after his family moved from Queens to North Massapequa. While still in high school, Guttenberg attended a summer program at the Juilliard School and studied under John Houseman. During that time period, he auditioned for and won a part in an off-Broadway production of The Lion in Winter.

After high school, Guttenberg attended the University at Albany, SUNY for a year. When he left SUNY, he moved to California to pursue an acting career. As he recounts, within weeks he was cast in a Kentucky Fried Chicken commercial playing opposite Colonel Sanders.

Career

1977 to 1984: Early roles to breakthrough
After playing an uncredited bit part in Rollercoaster, Guttenberg had his first screen credit in the TV movie Something for Joey (1977). He then played the starring role in the 1977 California high-school comedy The Chicken Chronicles, set in Beverly Hills in 1969. He also appeared in the 1978 film The Boys From Brazil, based on the Ira Levin bestseller, and guest-starred on Family.

Guttenberg starred in the short-lived TV series Billy (1979), based on Billy Liar. He had a supporting role in the tennis romance film Players (1979). In 1980, a Coca-Cola commercial featured him trying to help a non-English-speaking woman with a flat bicycle tire.

Guttenberg starred in the TV movie To Race the Wind (1980) playing blind lawyer Harold Krents. The same year, he starred in the Nancy Walker-directed Can't Stop the Music, a semiautobiographical movie about the disco group Village People.

Guttenberg played Jim Craig in the TV movie Miracle on Ice (1981). He appeared in Barry Levinson's Diner (1982), then starred in another short-lived TV series No Soap, Radio (1982). He starred in the action-comedy The Man Who Wasn't There (1983) and had a supporting part in the post-apocalyptic television movie The Day After (1983). Guttenberg starred in The Ferret (1984) a pilot for a TV series that was not picked up.

In 1984, Guttenberg played the lead role in Police Academy. It grossed $8.5 million in its opening weekend and over $149 million worldwide, against a budget of $4.5 million, and of the film franchise it launched, it is the most successful. He then became a busy star over the next four years, appearing in nine starring roles, tying with Gene Hackman for busiest actor.

1985 to 1990: Subsequent success 
In 1985, Police Academy was quickly followed by a sequel, Police Academy 2: Their First Assignment. Guttenberg then had the romantic male lead in Cocoon, another box-office success. A comedy in which he starred, Bad Medicine, was not particularly successful.

In 1986, Guttenberg played Pecos Bill in an episode of Tall Tales & Legends, then was in Police Academy 3: Back in Training.

In 1986, Guttenberg starred in Short Circuit opposite Ally Sheedy, another very popular film. 

In 1987, he changed pace with the thriller The Bedroom Window , directed by Curtis Hanson, then made Police Academy 4: Citizens on Patrol, his last Police Academy Film. Guttenberg had a cameo in Amazon Women on the Moon and supported Michael Caine and Sally Field in Surrender. Guttenberg had the biggest financial success of his career to date with Three Men and a Baby with Tom Selleck and Ted Danson. 

In 1988, he starred with Peter O'Toole and Daryl Hannah in High Spirits, which flopped.

In 1989, he appeared in the Michael Jackson music video "Liberian Girl". He also acted in Cocoon: The Return which was a commercial disappointment.

1990s
In 1990, he replaced Timothy Hutton in the lead role of Prelude to a Kiss at the Helen Hayes Theatre on Broadway. He also performed in London's West End, where he starred in The Boys Next Door. He appeared in the world stage premiere production of Furthest From the Sun, which Woody Harrelson directed and co-authored. In films, he acted in Don't Tell Her It's Me and 3 Men and a Little Lady.

He directed "Love Off Limits" for CBS Schoolbreak Special in 1993.

In 1995, he acted in The Big Green. He was among the ensemble in Home for the Holidays, and starred in It Takes Two with Kirstie Alley and Mary-Kate and Ashley Olsen. 

In 1997, he also starred in Zeus and Roxanne, Casper: A Spirited Beginning and alongside Kirsten Dunst in Disney's Tower of Terror, based on the attraction at the Disney's Hollywood Studios at the Walt Disney World Resort in Lake Buena Vista, Florida.

In 1998, Guttenberg acted in action films, Airborne, and Overdrive, as well as the comedy Home Team.

2000s
His first film as director/producer/co-screenwriter/star was P.S. Your Cat Is Dead (2002), a film adaptation of a novel and Broadway play by James Kirkwood, Jr. He starred in Mojave Phone Booth (2006) as Barry, and Making Change as Trafton. In Single Santa Seeks Mrs. Claus and its sequel Meet the Santas, he played the starring role of Nick.

He had a recurring role in the 2005–2006 season of the television series Veronica Mars as Woody Goodman, a wealthy businessman and community leader. He appeared as a lead in the NBC made-for-TV remake of The Poseidon Adventure, which aired on November 20, 2005, playing Richard Clarke, a failing writer having an affair with a massage therapist. He also appeared in According to Jim episode "Two for the Money" in 2008.

On August 25, 2008, Guttenberg released a video titled: "Steve Guttenberg's Steak House" on Will Ferrell's Funny or Die website. He took part in the 2008 spring season of Dancing with the Stars with professional dancer Anna Trebunskaya, and was eliminated on April 1.

In October 2008, a video was released which appeared to show Guttenberg jogging nearly naked through Central Park. On November 12, 2008, Guttenberg appeared as a guest on the British talk show The Paul O'Grady Show, where he said he made the video for Will Ferrell's Funny or Die website, but then decided to release it virally "as if it were real" as part of a challenge set on the show. He then went on to become the Guinness World Record Holder for preparing the most hot-dogs in one minute.

2010s 
Guttenberg played himself in an episode of the Starz comedy Party Down that aired May 21, 2010.

Guttenberg starred in season seven, episode six of Law & Order: Criminal Intent (air date: November 8, 2007).

He appeared on Broadway from late 2011 to early 2012 in Woody Allen's one-act play Honeymoon Hotel, which was part of the show Relatively Speaking.

Guttenberg can be seen on History Channel's 2015 miniseries Sons of Liberty. He plays Jack Bonner.

In fall 2014, Guttenberg wrapped production on SyFy Channel's Lavalantula, scheduled to premiere summer 2015.

Guttenberg was featured in season six, episode eight of Community, "Intro to Recycled Cinema", which aired on Yahoo Screen in April 2015.

Guttenberg starred in the Cinderella pantomime at Churchill Theatre in Bromley, UK, playing the Baron (father of Cinderella) in 2008. To celebrate Guttenberg's involvement, the local Empire Cinema screened Police Academy on 19 November. Guttenberg introduced the film and answered questions.

2020s
On May 21, 2020, Guttenberg appeared on Holey Moley II: The Sequel. Later, on August 2, he appeared on Last Week Tonight with John Oliver, via Cameo.

Guttenberg starred in the Lifetime film How to Murder Your Husband: The Nancy Brophy Story where he portrayed Daniel Brophy.

Upcoming, work in progress, and rumoured projects 
During an interview on November 4, 2009, Guttenberg mentioned that Disney was developing a second sequel to Three Men and a Baby, entitled Three Men and a Bride. Guttenberg stated that his co-stars, Ted Danson and Tom Selleck, would return for the sequel. He also expressed his interest in making additional sequels to the Police Academy and Cocoon movies, saying they would be surefire hits if they were to be made.

In an interview published August 1, 2010, Guttenberg revealed that David Diamond and David Weissman were writing a script for Police Academy 8. On September 3, 2018, Guttenberg said that a new Police Academy film is packaged but has no other details.

Miscellaneous 
Guttenberg's production company, Mr. Kirby Productions, is named after Gerald J. Kirby, his high-school drama teacher.

In 1995, he was name-checked in The Simpsons episode "Homer the Great" in the song "We Do", whereby a fictional ancient secret society called the Stonecutters (a parody of the Freemasons) claim it was them that made Guttenberg a star. Guttenberg was reportedly flattered by the reference.

Personal life 
Guttenberg married model Denise Bixler on September 30, 1988. They separated in June 1991 and divorced in 1992.

Guttenberg has lived with WCBS-TV reporter Emily Smith since 2014. On December 25, 2016, they announced their engagement. They married on January 19, 2019.

Philanthropy
Guttenberg is involved with charities whose goal is to improve opportunities for the homeless and for young people. In 2016, a trust in Guttenberg's honor was established to provide support services to the homeless population of Los Angeles. The Entertainment Industry Foundation, Hollywood's charity arm, selected him to be Ambassador for Children's Issues because of his work on behalf of children and the homeless.

At the 2016 New York Walk to Fight Lymphedema & Lymphatic Diseases in Brooklyn, Guttenberg announced, via a pre-recorded message, that he had joined the Lymphatic Education & Research Network's (LE&RN) Honorary Board.

Awards 
The sixth-annual Fire Island Golden Wagon Film Festival honored Guttenberg with the 2008 Tony Randall Lifetime Achievement Award for his work in the entertainment industry, as well as his community service. The award was created in tribute to the first Golden Wagon honoree, Tony Randall, and is given to a member of the entertainment industry who embodies the same love of Fire Island, independent spirit, and community service that Randall shared.

On December 12, 2011, Guttenberg received a star on the Hollywood Walk of Fame. The star is located at 6411 Hollywood Blvd.
On October 19, 2014, Guttenberg received a key to the city from Miami Beach Mayor Philip Levine for his work with Fun Paw Care, raising awareness for animal rights.

Publications

 The Guttenberg Bible - A memoir published in May 2012 by Thomas Dunne Books
 The Kids from D.I.S.C.O. (September 2014)

Filmography

References

External links
 
 
 

1958 births
Male actors from New York City
American male film actors
American male television actors
American male voice actors
Jewish American male actors
Juilliard School alumni
University at Albany, SUNY alumni
Living people
Participants in American reality television series
People from Brooklyn
American memoirists
Jewish American writers
20th-century American male actors
21st-century American male actors
People from North Massapequa, New York
People from Flushing, Queens
21st-century American Jews